Liam Shiels (born 29 April 1991) is an Australian rules footballer who plays for the North Melbourne Football Club, in the  Australian Football League (AFL). Shiels is a midfielder who developed into a key member of the midfield for the Hawthorn Football Club that would win three premierships in a row from 2013 to 2015. Shiels would also serve as vice-captain for Hawthorn from 2017–2018.

AFL career 
Shiels was a 2nd round selection in the 2008 AFL draft, being selected at No. 34 overall. He was the youngest player drafted that year. Shiels was still a high school student when he joined the Hawks; as a result, Hawthorn needed to obtain special dispensation from Shiels' high school in order to enable him to train during periods where training clashed with his afternoon classes.

Not expected to play in his first year, Shiels was training part-time and completing his schooling at Aquinas College Melbourne but after performances playing for Box Hill, Shiels was promoted to play against Adelaide. He played eleven games in his debut season.

Shiels and Josh Gibson were the only Hawthorn players to play every game in 2011.

Shiels was made joint Vice-Captain of the club in 2017, together with Isaac Smith. During Hawthorn's poor start to the 2017 season, Shiels instigated an assessment that the club was not playing satisfactorily. In the preseason, Shiels was sent to the AFL tribunal for striking Darcy Lang, but was not suspended. Shiels was widely regarded as having performed well as vice-captain and player during the 2017 season, registering a personal record for number of clearances per game.

Liam Shiels was regarded as having another good season in 2018, recording the sixth highest number of tackles in the league and setting a new disposal average record.

Shiels, along with Smith was replaced as Co-Vice-Captain prior to the 2019 season with Jack Gunston, though he remained part of the leadership group. Shiels played his 200th game during that season, which was a 24-point victory over rivals Geelong.

On August 31, 2022, Shiels announced his retirement after 14 seasons, 255 games & 3 premierships with the Hawks. His retirement didn't last long though, as on the 22nd November 2022, he came out of retirement to play for North Melbourne as a rookie listed player, reuniting with coach Alistair Clarkson.

Statistics

|-
| 2009 ||  || 26
| 11 || 1 || 3 || 65 || 85 || 150 || 25 || 49 || 0.1 || 0.3 || 5.9 || 7.7 || 13.6 || 2.3 || 4.5 || 0
|-
| 2010 ||  || 26
| 6 || 0 || 0 || 37 || 27 || 64 || 25 || 26 || 0.0 || 0.0 || 6.2 || 4.5 || 10.7 || 4.2 || 4.3 || 0
|-
| 2011 ||  || 26
| 25 || 11 || 14 || 344 || 221 || 565 || 138 || 150 || 0.4 || 0.6 || 13.8 || 8.8 || 22.6 || 5.5 || 6.0 || 0
|-
| 2012 ||  || 26
| 22 || 7 || 7 || 243 || 177 || 420 || 74 || 106 || 0.3 || 0.3 || 11.0 || 8.0 || 19.1 || 3.4 || 4.8 || 1
|-
| bgcolor=F0E68C | 2013# ||  || 26
| 17 || 3 || 8 || 164 || 96 || 260 || 61 || 54 || 0.2 || 0.5 || 9.6 || 5.6 || 15.3 || 3.6 || 3.2 || 0
|-
| bgcolor=F0E68C | 2014# ||  || 26
| 21 || 8 || 11 || 292 || 184 || 476 || 79 || 129 || 0.4 || 0.5 || 13.9 || 8.8 || 22.7 || 3.8 || 6.1 || 7
|-
| bgcolor=F0E68C | 2015# ||  || 26
| 22 || 13 || 9 || 248 || 229 || 477 || 79 || 162 || 0.6 || 0.4 || 11.3 || 10.4 || 21.7 || 3.6 || 7.4 || 5
|-
| 2016 ||  || 26
| 18 || 4 || 8 || 191 || 124 || 315 || 41 || 153 || 0.2 || 0.4 || 10.6 || 6.9 || 17.5 || 2.3 || 8.5 || 0
|-
| 2017 ||  || 26
| 21 || 9 || 10 || 239 || 216 || 455 || 76 || 129 || 0.4 || 0.5 || 11.4 || 10.3 || 21.7 || 3.6 || 6.1 || 5
|-
| 2018 ||  || 26
| 23 || 9 || 3 || 332 || 200 || 532 || 85 || 149 || 0.4 || 0.1 || 14.4 || 8.7 || 23.1 || 3.7 || 6.5 || 8
|-
| 2019 ||  || 26
| 19 || 10 || 12 || 249 || 192 || 441 || 65 || 126 || 0.5 || 0.6 || 13.1 || 10.1 || 23.2 || 3.4 || 6.6 || 5
|-
| 2020 ||  || 26
| 16 || 6 || 0 || 162 || 124 || 286 || 46 || 55 || 0.4 || 0.0 || 10.1 || 7.8 || 17.9 || 2.9 || 3.4 || 1
|-
| 2021 ||  || 26
| 21 || 5 || 4 || 244 || 200 || 444 || 93 || 99 || 0.2 || 0.2 || 11.6 || 9.5 || 21.1 || 4.4 || 4.7 || 0
|-
| 2022 ||  || 26
| 13 || 4 || 4 || 84 || 62 || 146 || 32 || 39 || 0.3 || 0.3 || 6.5 || 4.8 || 11.2 || 2.5 || 3.0 || 0
|- class="sortbottom"
! colspan=3| Career
! 255 !! 90 !! 93 !! 2894 !! 2137 !! 5031 !! 919 !! 1426 !! 0.4 !! 0.4 !! 11.3 !! 8.4 !! 19.7 !! 3.6 !! 5.6 !! 32
|}

Notes

Honours and achievements
Team
 3× AFL premiership player: 2013, 2014, 2015
 2× Minor premiership: 2012, 2013

Individual
  vice-captain: 2017–2018
  best player in finals: 2018
  best clubman: 2017
  most improved player: 2011
  best first year player (debut season): 2009
 Australian international rules football team: 2011
  life member

Cited references

External links

 

Hawthorn Football Club players
Hawthorn Football Club Premiership players
Box Hill Football Club players
1991 births
Living people
Australian rules footballers from Victoria (Australia)
Eastern Ranges players
Australian people of Irish descent
Australia international rules football team players
Three-time VFL/AFL Premiership players